Momarken, is a racecourse to the north of Mysen, Norway, in the Eidsberg municipality in Østfold. Here you can find Harness racing at Momarken Travbane and also the annual Momarkedet organised by Mysen and the Omegn Red Cross.

External links
 Momarkedet

Geography of Østfold
Eidsberg
Horse racing venues in Norway